is a Buddhist temple located in eastern Kyoto, Japan. The temple is part of the Historic Monuments of Ancient Kyoto (Kyoto, Uji and Otsu Cities) UNESCO World Heritage site.

History 

Kiyomizu-dera was founded in the early Heian period. By 778, it was owned by the Buddhist Kita-Hosso sect under Enchin Shonin. He was a priest from Nara (capital of Japan from 710 to 784), who received a vision to construct the temple next to the Otowa spring.

In 798, the shogun Sakanoue Tamuramaro, improved the site by including a large hall that was reassembled from the palace of Emperor Kammu (r. 781–806). The emperor left Nara due to the strong influence that the Buddhist monasteries had on the government there. During this period there was a strong rivalry between the Kofuku-ji and the Kiyomizu-dera temples and both had strong influences around the region.

The temple's present buildings were constructed in 1633, ordered built by Tokugawa Iemitsu. There is not a single nail used in the entire structure. It takes its name from the waterfall within the complex, which runs off the nearby hills. Kiyomizu means clear water, or pure water.

It was originally affiliated with the old and influential Hossō sect dating from Nara times. However, in 1965 it severed that affiliation, and its present custodians call themselves members of the "Kitahossō" sect.

Present 

The popular expression "to jump off the stage at Kiyomizu" is the Japanese translation of the English expression "to take the plunge". This refers to an Edo-period tradition that held that if one were to survive a  jump from the stage, one's wish would be granted. During the Edo period, 234 jumps were recorded, and of those, 85.4% survived. The practice was prohibited in 1872.

The temple complex includes several other shrines, among them the Jishu Shrine, dedicated to Ōkuninushi, a god of love and "good matches". Success in reaching the other stone with their eyes closed implies that the pilgrim will find love, or true love. One can be assisted in the crossing, but this is taken to mean that a go-between will be needed. The person's romantic interest can assist them as well.

The complex also offers various talismans, incense, and omikuji (paper fortunes). The site is particularly popular during festivals (especially at New Year's and during obon in the summer) when additional booths fill the grounds selling traditional holiday foodstuffs and souvenirs to throngs of visitors.

In 2007, Kiyomizu-dera was one of 21 finalists for the New Seven Wonders of the World, but was not picked as one of the seven winning sites. The temple was covered entirely by semi-transparent scaffolding while undergoing restoration works in preparation for the 2020 Olympics.

Architecture 
Kiyomizu-dera is located on the foothills of Mount Otowa, part of the Higashiyama mountain range that dominates eastern Kyoto. The main hall has a large veranda, supported by tall pillars, that juts out over the hillside and offers impressive views of the city. Large verandas and main halls were constructed at many popular sites during the Edo period to accommodate large numbers of pilgrims.

Beneath the main hall is the Otowa waterfall, where three channels of water fall into a pond. Visitors can catch and drink the water, which is believed to have wish-granting powers. There is also the Tainai Meguri, a dark tunnel said to represent the womb of the bodhisattva Mahāpratisarā.

Gallery

See also

Historic Monuments of Ancient Kyoto (Kyoto, Uji and Otsu Cities)
List of Buddhist temples in Kyoto
List of National Treasures of Japan (temples)
The Glossary of Japanese Buddhism for an explanation of terms concerning Japanese Buddhism, Japanese Buddhist art, and Japanese Buddhist temple architecture
Tourism in Japan

References

Sources

External links

Kiyomizu-dera Temple at Official Kyoto Travel Guide
Kiyomizu-dera Temple home page 
Photos and details of Kiyomizu-dera as a pilgrimage destination

8th-century establishments in Japan
Buddhist temples in Kyoto
Hōnen
Important Cultural Properties of Japan
National Treasures of Japan
Religious organizations established in the 8th century
World Heritage Sites in Japan
Religious buildings and structures completed in 778